Čierny Potok is a village and municipality in the Rimavská Sobota District of the Banská Bystrica Region of southern Slovakia.

History
The village arose in 1955 by separation from Hodejov. During Hungarian occupation in World War II,  many inhabitants were deported to concentration camps.

References

External links
 
 
http://www.e-obce.sk/obec/ciernypotok/cierny-potok.html

Villages and municipalities in Rimavská Sobota District